Kalevi Vilho Tapio ”Kallu” Tuominen (9 August 1927 – 23 January 2020) was a Finnish basketball coach and player and sports executive, who also played handball and football at the national top-tier level as well as practiced many other sports. He worked as the overall head coach of Finnish Olympic Committee between 1969–1992. In basketball, the  Jantunen played his whole SM-sarja career for Tampereen Pyrintö and also coached the team between 1960–1964. He was capped 11 times as a player and was a long-time head coach of Finland men's national team in its peak era. During Tuominen's coaching years 1955–1969 Finland qualified for 1964 Summer Olympics in Tokyo (the only Finnish ball game team still in 2016 that has advanced to Olympics through qualification), where it placed 11th, and played in seven EuroBaskets (1955 [Tuominen as player-coach], 1957, 1959, 1961, 1963, 1965 and 1967). In EuroBasket 1967 arranged in Finland, the host team placed sixth, which is still in 2016 Finland's best position in EuroBasket. Finland women's national basketball team placed 11th with Tuominen's guidance in EuroBasket 1956 Women. He worked also as a FIBA-licensed referee. Tuominen was inducted to Finnish Basketball Hall of Fame as one of its first members in 2009. Pyrintö has retired Tuominen's jersey but allows players to use his number 15.

Tuominen died after a long illness at Suursuo Hospital in Helsinki on 23 January 2020, aged 92.

Trophies, awards and achievements
 Inducted in Finnish Basketball Hall of Fame
 Jersey #15 retired by Tampereen Pyrintö

Basketball (player) 
 10th place in EuroBasket 1955
 SM-sarja silver medal in 1958

Basketball (coach) 
 Finland national team
 1964 Summer Olympics (11th)
 six EuroBaskets, 6th place in 1967
 Finland women's national team
 11th in EuroBasket 1956 Women

Sources

References

1927 births
2020 deaths
Association footballers not categorized by position
Basketball referees
Finnish basketball coaches
Finnish footballers
Finnish male handball players
Finnish men's basketball players
Sportspeople from Tampere
Tampereen Pyrintö players